The Battle of Werben was a battle of the Thirty Years' War, fought on 7 August 1631 (N.S.), between the Swedish Empire and the Holy Roman Empire. The Swedes had 15,100 soldiers and were led by Gustavus Adolphus, while the Imperialists had 16,200 soldiers and were led by Field-Marshal Count Tilly. Tilly's troops attacked Gustavus' entrenchments in front of Werben (Elbe), but Swedish batteries and the cavalry under Wolf Heinrich von Baudissin forced them to retreat, at the cost of 1,000 Imperials and 200 Swedes. Gustavus inflated Imperial losses to 7,000 to win German support.

References

Bibliography
George Bruce. Harbottle's Dictionary of Battles. (Van Nostrand Reinhold, 1981).
 
 

1631 in Europe
Werben
Werben
Werben
Werben
Werben
1631 in the Holy Roman Empire
Gustavus Adolphus of Sweden